Bracher is a surname. Notable people with the surname include:

 Barbara Kay Bracher (maiden name) (1955–2001), lawyer and conservative American television commentator
 Chris Bracher, three time world champion BriSCA race car driver 
 Clemens Bracher (born 1987), Swiss bobsledder
 Edward Bracher, English Victorian photographer based in Oxford
 Elisa Bracher (born 1965), Brazilian artist
 Hermann Bracher (1895–1974), highly decorated German Oberst in the Wehrmacht during World War II
 Karl Dietrich Bracher (1922–2016), German political scientist and author
Rose Bracher (1894-1941), British botanist

See also
 Bracher Elementary School, Santa Clara, CA, US
 Bracher Park, Santa Clara, CA, US
 Bracher Pocket Park, Spring Branch, Texas, US
 Erich Bracher School, Ludwigsburg, Baden-Württemberg, Germany

Surnames of German origin